Commando: Steel Disaster is a run and gun video game for the Nintendo DS developed by Mana Computer Software. The gameplay is similar to that of Metal Slug, as players control an operative to stop a militant organization through five stages of combat featuring gunplay and dodging projectiles in a 2D, hand-drawn style.

Story
The story begins with several sectors of a military group report being attacked by their own war machines. A a terrorist organization led by a man named Rattlesnake is purported to be responsible. A commando and vehicle specialist code-named Storm is assigned to enter each affected area and progressively stop Rattlesnake's ambitions.

Gameplay
Players control Storm throughout the various stages of combat. The player’s objective is to progress through each level while collecting weapons and ammunition in order to survive long enough to defeat the end-level boss. The storyline progresses at the beginning of each stage as Storm's communications officer, Jessica, informs him where to go next. Players can hold up to two firearms, which they can switch between, and can also hold a certain amount of hand grenades. The player has no extend or extra life bonuses. If a player dies, then a game over occurs and then the player restarts that specific mission over from the beginning. Players can start and save their own profiles, but it is necessary to beat the first level in order to save any progress. Occasionally, Storm commands a vehicle, although this mostly happens at the beginning of the game, but additionally by the game’s climax.

Reception

Commando: Steel Disaster received mixed reviews from critics upon release. On Metacritic, the game holds a score of 64/100 based on 6 reviews, indicating “mixed or average reviews”. On GameRankings, the game holds a score of 61.11% based on 9 reviews.

References 

Nintendo DS games
Run and gun games
Nintendo DS-only games
2008 video games
Video games developed in China

Single-player video games
XS Games games